The Finnish Border Guard is the agency responsible for enforcing the security of Finland's borders. It is a military organisation, subordinate to the Ministry of the Interior in administrative issues and to the President of Finland in issues pertaining to his authority as Commander-in-Chief (e.g. officer promotions). The agency has police and investigative powers in immigration matters and can independently investigate immigration violations. The Border Guard has search and rescue (SAR) duties, both maritime and inland. Missions inland are often carried out in co-operation with local fire and rescue departments or other authorities.

The Finnish Border Guard consists of 3,800 active duty personnel. Upon mobilization, it would be wholly or partly incorporated into the Finnish Defence Forces and its strength increased with reservists who have served their conscription in the branch. The mobilized strength of the Finnish Border Guard is 12,600 servicemen. The Finnish-Russian border is actively monitored. The western sea borders and the western and northern land borders to Sweden and Norway are free to cross under the Nordic passport union, the Border Guard does however maintain personnel in these regions owing to its SAR duties.

There is a separate Finnish Customs agency, and immigration is also handled by the Finnish police and the Finnish Directorate of Immigration. PTR (police, customs and border guard) co-operation is well-developed and allows the authorities to conduct each other's duties if necessary.

Duties and jurisdiction

Main duties of the Finnish Border Guard:
 Protecting the land borders and territorial waters of Finland from unauthorised encroachment.
 Passport control at border crossing points, airports and ports.
 First line of defence against territorial invasions.
 Rescue operations (mainly at sea and in the remote areas of Lapland).
 Provide aid to other authorities such as the fire department in case of unusual events like wild fires.
 Investigation of crimes pertaining to border security.
 Aiding police forces in civil duties such as crowd control and riot control.
 Military operations pertaining to internal security.
 Customs control in the minor border crossing points without customs authorities.
 Training of conscripts for wartime duty. These include rajajääkäri (border jaegers) and erikoisrajajääkäri (special border jaegers).
 (during wartime) Long range patrols and guerrilla tactics behind enemy lines.

For the discharge of its duties, the Border Guard has limited police powers in the areas where it operates. It can, for example, seize and arrest persons and conduct searches in apartments and cars pursuant to same legislation as the police, when investigating a crime. However, the power to arrest a person has been delegated only to the commanding officers of a border control detachments and commanders and vice-commanders of larger units.

The Border Guard is not supposed to be used for the keeping of public order under normal circumstances, but it has two readiness platoons that can be used to support the Police in exceptional situations in matters of crowd control and internal security (including incidents involving dangerous armed criminals).
The readiness platoons have been used to supplement riot police during high-profile international events where there is a perceived danger of violent demonstrations, e.g. during the "Smash ASEM" demonstration in 2006. However, the main duty of the readiness platoons is to handle the most demanding border security incidents. Border Guard helicopters have also been used to assist police and rescue authorities in various missions.

The Border Guard also has the power to keep public order in its own facilities and in their immediate vicinity. For the execution of its military exercises, any officer with the minimum rank of Captain can close an area temporarily.

The Border Guard is responsible for enforcing the 3–5 km border zone towards Russia and issues the permits to visit the zone.

Organisation

Administrative units are responsible for the functions of the Border Guard. These administrative units are the Border Guard Headquarters, Southeast Finland, North Karelia, Kainuu and Lapland border guard districts, the Gulf of Finland and West Finland coast guard districts, Air Patrol Squadron and Border and Coast Guard Academy.

The Border Guards have two readiness units; the 1st Special Intervention Unit, which operates in South-Eastern Finland, and the 5th Special Intervention Unit, who operates in the Gulf of Finland area.

Training
The basic training of border guard personnel is based in Imatra, while the sea training for coast guards is based in Turku.

Equipment

Watercraft

The Border Guard operates:
 Three patrol vessels - Turva, Tursas, and Uisko
 6 Griffon 2000TD hovercraft
 26 Watercat 1300 patrol boats
 15 RV90 coast guard boats, plus other smaller boats.

Vehicles

The Finnish Border Guard operates by several types of vehicles on soil. 

The list of operative vehicles:

Patrol cars - consisting of different types and models  
All-terrain vehicles
Snowmobiles

Operative personnel's equipment
Officers carry on a daily basis:
 TETRA
 Glock17, Glock19, Glock26
 Pepper spray
 Taser - model X2 by Axon Enterprise
 Baton (law enforcement)
 Handcuffs
 Light and heavy ballistic armor
 Service dogs - The Finnish Border Guard has K9 units on every district. The most popular service dog species are German shepherd and Belgian malinois.

Small arms
Light weapons:
 Rk 95 TP
 Rk 62 - several versions
 Heckler & Koch G36
 Glock pistols
 TRG-42
 CZ Scorpion Evo 3
 Heckler & Koch HK416

Heavy arms
Heavy weapons:
 NSV machine gun
 PK machine gun
 Automatic grenade launcher
 APILAS
 Rocket-propelled grenade
 Grenade
 Explosive weapon - explosives and mines

Aircraft 

The Border Guard operates 14 aircraft, including 12 helicopters. The AB 412s are to be replaced by new twin-engined helicopters, while the Super Pumas and Dornier 228s are being modernized.

MVX Programme
The Border Guard has announced that due to increasing problems with Dornier 228's, they are to be replaced by new aircraft. With a budget of 60 million euro, a letter has been sent to around 20 suppliers. Candidates include the Airbus C295 MSA, ATR 42 and ATR 72, and the Bombardier Challenger 650. In April 2022, the budget of the Dornier 228 MVX replacement program was increased to 163 million euros, along with other defence spending boosts in wake of the 2022 Russian invasion of Ukraine.

The MVX programme has received a total of 14 different offers:

Lighter aircraft

 Diamond DA62 MPP
 PZL M28 Skytruck
 Let L-410NG
 Piaggio P180 Avanti EVO
 Beechcraft King Air 300
 Beechcraft King Air 350
 Beechcraft King Air 360ER

Larger, propeller-driven turbine powered aircraft, either new or used

Used:

 ATR 42-300
 ATR 72-600
 ATR 72MM
 de Havilland DHC-8-100
 de Havilland DHC-8-300

New:
 de Havilland DHC-8-400
 Airbus C295MSA

Jet-engined aircraft

 Cessna Citation Longitude
 Bombardier Challenger 650
 Dassault Falcon 2000MVX
 Embraer Praetor 600

History 

After the Finnish Civil War in 1919, the control of the Finnish borders was given to the former Finnish Russian frontier troops under the command of the Ministry of Interior. Until 1945, only the Russian border was supervised by the Frontier Guard, the Swedish and Norwegian borders having only customs control. In 1929, a separate Sea Guard was founded to prevent the rampant alcohol smuggling caused by the Finnish prohibition of alcohol (1919–32).

At the start of the Winter War there were nine Border Companies (Rajakomppania) on the Karelian Isthmus. North of Lake Ladoga the Frontier Guards were combined into six Detached Battalions (Erillinen pataljoona). Further north in Petsamo the defence was left to the 10th Detached Company (10. Erillinen komppania). After the war marshal Mannerheim awarded all frontier guards the title "Border jäger" (Rajajääkäri). During the Continuation War, the Frontier Guard companies were combined into 12 Border Jäger battalions (Rajajääkäripataljoona) and later during the Lapland War into a Border Jäger Brigade (Rajajääkäriprikaati).

Current activities 

After the Second World War, the Border Guards were placed on all Finnish borders. In 1950s, the Sea Guard was attached to the Border Guard. Since then, the Border Guard has received a fine public image. It is famed for the wilderness skills of its guards foot-patrolling the forest-covered Russian border, its good efficiency in catching the few illegal border crossers and for the fact that it is the only state authority in large parts of Lapland. In these matters it resembles the popular image of the Royal Canadian Mounted Police. The Border Guard of Finland is one of the links of the chain of protectors of the external borders of the European Union and Schengen agreement.

Nearly every Border Guard District trains small number of conscripts for long range reconnaissance (Finnish: Sissi). Conscripts in Border Guard companies are mostly volunteers and preferably selected from the occupants of border areas, and while trained by Border Guard, they do not perform regular border control duties. Rivalry between Sissi from Border Guards and Defence Forces is traditionally high.

Employment in Border Guard is much sought for, especially in North and Eastern Finland, which suffer from chronic unemployment problems. Typically a vacancy in the Border Guard receives at least 50 applications.

See also
 Crime in Finland
 Finnish Security Intelligence Service
 Frontex (The European Agency for the Management of Operational Cooperation at the External Borders of the Member States of the European Union)
 Law enforcement in Finland
 National Bureau of Investigation (Finland)
 Police brutality in Finland
 Police of Finland

References

External links

Official website

Finland
Borders of Finland
Law enforcement agencies of Finland
Military of Finland